Gary Knight is a British photographer and architect.

Gary Knight may also refer to:
Gary Knight, American singer and songwriter, one half of the 1960s duo Dey and Knight
Gary Knight (cricketer) (born 1950), former Australian cricketer
Gary Knight (rugby player) (born 1951), former New Zealand rugby union player

See also